Why Do the Heathen Rage? is a 2014 album by The Soft Pink Truth of house and techno renditions of black metal songs.

Track listing 

Track listing adapted from AllMusic.

Reception 

The album received "universal acclaim", according to review score aggregator Metacritic.

References

External links 

 

2014 albums
The Soft Pink Truth albums
Thrill Jockey albums